Covenant Christian School  is a private Christian school in Conroe, Texas, United States.

CCS was formed in 1982 under the original name of Conroe Bible Christian School. The name was changed to Covenant Christian School in 1983 in an effort to appeal to a broader segment of the Christian community. For the first eighteen years, the school functioned as a ministry of Conroe Bible Church and used the CBC facilities as its campus. The school has always been governed by an independent Board of Trustees, composed of parents of students at Covenant. The student body is made up of families from Montgomery, Walker, San Jacinto, and Liberty counties. Covenant families currently represent approximately twelve denominations and more than fifty local churches.

References

External links

 Covenant Christian School

Private K-12 schools in Texas
High schools in Montgomery County, Texas
Christian schools in Texas
Private schools in Greater Houston